Johnsonville is a hamlet located in the towns of Pittstown and Schaghticoke  in Rensselaer County, New York, United States. It was named for its settler, William Johnson.

History 

Johnsonville was home to Johnsonville Axe Manufacturing company and a bobbin factory (Johnsonville Bobbin Works) in the late 19th century.

The Baum–Wallis Farmstead, Cannon–Brownell–Herrington Farmstead, and Thomas–Wiley–Johnson Farmstead are listed on the National Register of Historic Places.  All three of these properties are located on the plateau south of the Hoosic River, all more than five miles distant from Johnsonville.

References

External links 
 Earth, Air & Waterworks

Hamlets in New York (state)
Hamlets in Rensselaer County, New York